Zolton Anton Ferency (June 30, 1922 – March 23, 1993) was an American lawyer, political activist and Professor of Criminal Justice at Michigan State University (MSU).

Ferency was born in Detroit, Michigan, in a Hungarian-American family. He served in World War II, and graduated from Michigan State University and the Detroit College of Law.

Ferency was a three-time chairman of the Michigan Democratic Party. He was an unsuccessful Democratic candidate for Governor of Michigan in 1966, when he was defeated, as expected, by George W. Romney. He also served as first President of the Human Rights Party, which he helped found in 1970 after breaking with the Democratic Party over its support for the Vietnam War. He rejoined the Democrats in 1976.

Ferency was elected to the Ingham County Board of Commissioners in 1980, and to the East Lansing City Council in 1991. He was serving on the city council at his death. He was a frequent if unsuccessful candidate for other public offices, running for governor in 1966, 1970, 1974, 1978, and 1982; for Justice of the Michigan Supreme Court in 1972, 1976, and 1986; and for the Michigan Senate, 24th District, in 1990.

Ferency taught criminal justice at MSU from 1971 until his retirement in 1990.

Ferency lived in East Lansing, Michigan. He died on March 23, 1993 in Lansing, Michigan.

The Ferency House in the Michigan State University Student Housing Cooperative and the Zolton Ferency Endowed Scholarship at MSU commemorate Ferency.

References
Specific

General
 http://politicalgraveyard.com/bio/fentress-fergus.html
 Time (magazine)
 https://web.archive.org/web/20060901075833/http://www.cj.msu.edu/%7Ehistory/sleuths.html
 https://web.archive.org/web/20070927200346/http://www.urbanoptions.org/resources/sundial/sun04fall.pdf
 https://web.archive.org/web/20110320013707/http://www.msu.coop:80/zolton-ferency

Michigan State University faculty
1922 births
1993 deaths
Human Rights Party (United States) politicians
Michigan Democrats
People from East Lansing, Michigan
Michigan State University alumni
Detroit College of Law alumni
County commissioners in Michigan
Michigan city council members
Lawyers from Detroit
American people of Hungarian descent
Military personnel from Michigan
American military personnel of World War II
20th-century American politicians
20th-century American lawyers